Neil Killeen (born 17 October 1975 in Shotley Bridge, Consett, County Durham) is an English coach and former cricketer. During his playing career played for Durham County Cricket Club, Marylebone Cricket Club and Combined Universities.  he is the fast-bowling coach for the England national side.

He began playing cricket aged ten, at Annfield Plain Cricket Club, playing at the various age groups and represented Durham at all ages and levels including first-class. He began his career with Durham as a schoolboy in 1992, when he was selected for the first team squad on a tour to Zimbabwe. He signed on a full contract with the club in 1995. He made his first-class debut in 1995 against the West Indies and  he was awarded his county cap in 1999. He toured the Caribbean with Young England in 1994/95, and toured with the M.C.C. in 2000.

He was best known for his exploits in the one-day game and is Durham's leading wicket-taker in the format, taking 298 wickets in 221 games. He played his last game for Durham against the Kent Spitfires in a Clydesdale Bank 40 match on 4 September 2010, taking 3 wickets in a 31 run defeat.

He moved from playing into coaching in 2011, spending 12 years with Durham before being appointed Elite pace bowling coach by England in January 2023.

External links
Cricket Online Profile

References

English cricketers
Durham cricketers
1975 births
Living people
Sportspeople from Consett
Cricketers from County Durham
Marylebone Cricket Club cricketers
British Universities cricketers
People from Shotley Bridge